The EFF Pioneer Award is an annual prize by the Electronic Frontier Foundation (EFF) for people who have made significant contributions to the empowerment of individuals in using computers. Until 1998 it was presented at a ceremony in Washington, D.C., United States. Thereafter it was presented at the Computers, Freedom, and Privacy conference. In 2007 it was presented at the O'Reilly Emerging Technology Conference.

Winners 
 1992: Douglas Engelbart, Robert E. Kahn, Tom Jennings, Jim Warren, Andrzej Smereczynski
 1993: Paul Baran, Vint Cerf, Ward Christensen, Dave Hughes, USENET developers (accepted by Tom Truscott and Jim Ellis)
 1994: Ivan Sutherland, Bill Atkinson, Whitfield Diffie and Martin Hellman, Murray Turoff and Starr Roxanne Hiltz, Lee Felsenstein, and the WELL (the Whole Earth 'Lectronic Link)
 1995: Philip Zimmermann, Anita Borg, Willis Ware
 1996: Robert Metcalfe, Peter Neumann, Shabbir Safdar and Matt Blaze
 1997: Hedy Lamarr and George Antheil (special award; posthumous with respect to Antheil), Johan Helsingius, Marc Rotenberg
 1998: Linus Torvalds, Richard Stallman, Barbara Simons
 1999: Jon Postel (posthumous award), Drazen Pantic, Simon Davies
 2000: "Librarians Everywhere" (accepted by Karen G. Schneider), Tim Berners-Lee, Phil Agre
 2001: Bruce Ennis (posthumous award), Seth Finkelstein, Stephanie Perrin
 2002: Dan Gillmor, Beth Givens, Jon Johansen and Writers of DeCSS
 2003: Amy Goodman, Eben Moglen, David Sobel
 2004: Kim Alexander, David L. Dill, Avi Rubin (for security issues with electronic voting)
 2005: Mitch Kapor, Edward Felten, Patrick Ball
 2006: Craigslist, Gigi Sohn, Jimmy Wales
 2007: Yochai Benkler, Cory Doctorow, Bruce Schneier
 2008: Mozilla Foundation and its chair Mitchell Baker; Michael Geist; and AT&T whistleblower Mark Klein
 2009: Limor "Ladyada" Fried, Harri Hursti and Carl Malamud
 2010: Steven Aftergood, James Boyle, Pamela Jones of the Groklaw website and Hari Krishna Prasad Vemuru
 2011: Ron Wyden, Ian Goldberg, and Nawaat.org
 2012: Andrew (bunnie) Huang, Jérémie Zimmermann, The Tor Project
 2013: Aaron Swartz (posthumous award), James Love, Glenn Greenwald and Laura Poitras
 2014: Frank La Rue, Zoe Lofgren, Trevor Paglen
 2015: Caspar Bowden (posthumous award), Citizen Lab, Anriette Esterhuysen and the Association for Progressive Communications and Kathy Sierra
 2016: Malkia Cyril of the Center for Media Justice, data protection activist Max Schrems, the authors of the "Keys Under Doormats" report, and California State Senators Mark Leno and Joel Anderson.
 2017: Chelsea Manning, Mike Masnick, Annie Game
 2018:  Stephanie Lenz, Joe McNamee (from EDRi), Sarah T. Roberts
 2019: danah boyd, Oakland Privacy, William Gibson
 2020: Joy Buolamwini, Dr. Timnit Gebru, Deborah Raji; Danielle Blunt; Open Technology Fund Community
 2021: Kade Crockford, Pam Dixon, Matt Mitchell
Name change to EFF Awards:
 2022: Alaa Abd El-Fattah, Digital Defense Fund, Kyle Wiens

See also

 List of computer-related awards

References

Internet-related activism
Computer-related awards
Human rights awards
Awards established in 1992